Clifton Association Football Club, later known as Clifton Football Club, was a football club based in the Clifton area of Bristol in the late 19th century.

Clifton Association was a founder member of the Western League (then called the Bristol and District League) in 1892, and was instrumental in the creation of the Gloucestershire Cup competition in 1888.

In 1893 the word Association was dropped from their name, which became Clifton. The team resigned from the league shortly after the start of the 1897–98 season.

League history

References
Clifton Association Football Club
Clifton Association from Football Club History Database (retrieved 20 October 2007).
Clifton from Football Club History Database (retrieved 20 October 2007).

Defunct football clubs in Bristol
Defunct football clubs in England
Clifton, Bristol
Association football clubs disestablished in 1897
Association football clubs established in 1892